Metropolitan Stephanos of Tallinn and All Estonia (born 29 April 1940) is the current primate (elected in 1999) of the Orthodox Church of Estonia.

Life

Metropolitan Stephanos was born Christakis Charalambides in Bukavu, Belgian Congo (now DR Congo). His parents were of Cypriot ancestry.

The future metropolitan undertook a year of study towards a medical degree at the Catholic University of Leuven in Belgium, but elected in 1960 to switch to divinity studies. He transferred to the St. Sergius Orthodox Theological Institute in Paris, simultaneously pursuing studies at the University of Paris. He was awarded the degree of Master of Theology from St. Sergius and the degree of lector from the university.

Charalambides was ordained to the diaconate on 6 January 1963 and to the priesthood on 17 November 1968 for service in the Greek Orthodox Metropolis of France. He was appointed in 1972 as protosyngellos (i.e., episcopal vicar) for the southern region of France, with his base in Nice. Fr. Stephanos was consecrated on 25 March 1987 to the episcopacy with the titular title of Bishop of Nazianzus. While continuing his previous responsibilities, he took on new assignments: secretary of the Assembly of Orthodox Bishops of France, lector at St. Sergius, and professor of patrology at the Roman Catholic seminary of Nice.

In 1996, the Ecumenical Patriarchate restored the Estonian Orthodox Church as an autonomous entity under its protection, following the independence of Estonia from the Soviet Union. A General Assembly of the church elected Bishop Stephanos as Metropolitan of Tallinn and All Estonia. The new metropolitan was installed on 21 March 1999.

Honours 

 Legion of Honour, Officer (2003)
 Order of the White Star, 2nd Class (2007)

See also
 Orthodox Church of Estonia

References

External links
 Eesti Apostlik-Õigeusu Kirik (homepage of the Orthodox Church of Estonia)
 Biography of Metropolitan Stephanos at the website of the Orthodox Church of Estonia

1940 births
Living people
Eastern Orthodox primates
Bishops of the Estonian Apostolic Orthodox Church
Belgian people of Greek descent
Eastern Orthodox Christians from Belgium
Eastern Orthodox metropolitans
People from Bukavu
Recipients of the Order of the White Star, 2nd Class
Democratic Republic of the Congo emigrants to Estonia
Belgian emigrants to Estonia
Estonian people of Greek descent